The Women's vault event took place on 7 October 2010, at the Indira Gandhi Arena.

Final

References
Results

Gymnastics at the 2010 Commonwealth Games
2010 in women's gymnastics